Juan Francisco "Juanfran" Guevara Silvente (born 19 August 1995 in Lorca, Murcia, Spain) is a retired Spanish Grand Prix motorcycle road racer, who last competed in the Moto3 World Championship with the RBA Racing Team.

Career

Grand Prix motorcycle racing

By season

Races by year
(key) (Races in bold indicate pole position, races in italics indicate fastest lap)

References

External links

1995 births
Living people
People from Lorca, Spain
Spanish motorcycle racers
125cc World Championship riders
Moto3 World Championship riders
Sportspeople from the Region of Murcia